True Story: A Novel is a book by Bill Maher. It was Maher's first book, and his only novel. It was first published in 1994 by Random House and was published in 2000 by Simon & Schuster. The book is an episodic novel detailing the true accounts of Maher and other stand-up comics in the late 1970s and early 1980s.

Production
Maher began writing True Story while he was working in comedy clubs, shortly after graduating from Cornell University with a degree in English. {{Quote|I did have a deep desire to write one novel. I always believed from my English studies that most novelists wrote one great novel and then pretty much wrote the same one over and over. So I thought I'd just write one.|Bill Maher}}

Reception
Richard Bernstein from The New York Times gave a mixed to favourable review, stating "when True Story works, it works because of Mr. Maher's energetic intelligence and his creation of characters whose prolonged sophomorism has distinct qualities", as did Raw Sawhill from The New York Times'', who stated that whilst the first half of the book seemed like "an underdramatized blur", Maher "comes through with a handful of well-conceived scenes" in its second half.

References

1994 American novels
1994 debut novels
Comedy books
Random House books
Books by Bill Maher